Thierry Debès (born 13 January 1974, in Strasbourg) is a retired French football goalkeeper. He was once AC Ajaccio's captain. In October 2014, Debés was named Interim Coach of AC Ajaccio. In his first game, he led Ajaccio to a 2-1 victory against Valenciennes on 24 October 2014.

References

 lequipe.fr Source for actual size

1974 births
Living people
French footballers
RC Strasbourg Alsace players
Grenoble Foot 38 players
En Avant Guingamp players
AC Ajaccio players
Ligue 1 players
Ligue 2 players
Footballers from Strasbourg
Association football goalkeepers